Pristimantis olivaceus is a species of frog in the family Strabomantidae.
It is found in Bolivia and Peru.
Its natural habitats are tropical moist lowland forests and moist montane forests.

References

olivaceus
Amphibians of Bolivia
Amphibians of Peru
Amphibians described in 1998
Taxonomy articles created by Polbot